Absdorf is a municipality in the district of Tulln in the Austrian state of Lower Austria.

Population

Personalities
Alois Benjamin Saliger

References

External links

Cities and towns in Tulln District
Cadastral community of Tulln District